Mitromorpha canopusensis is a species of sea snail, a marine gastropod mollusk in the family Mitromorphidae.

Description

Distribution
This marine species occurs in the Western Atlantic Ocean.

References

 Mifsud, C. (2009) Two new species of Mitromorpha Carpenter 1865 from the western Atlantic (Conoidea: Mitromorphinae). Journal of Conchology, 40, 99–101

External links
 Gastropods.com: Mitromorpha canopusensis

canopusensis
Gastropods described in 2009